The Afripedia Project was launched in mid-June 2012 and is ongoing. It aims to expand offline Wikipedia access in French-speaking Africa, and encourage Africans to contribute to Wikipedia. The project installs local Kiwix-serve wireless and intranet servers and provides training and maintenance support.

The founding partners are Wikimédia France, the Institut Français, and the Agence universitaire de la Francophonie. French is spoken by an estimated 120 million (2010) people in Africa, spread across 24 francophone countries.

Access to Wikipedia from USB keys was not new in Africa, but keys are often very outdated, where Afripedia is regularly updated. Many of the partnering universities have low-bandwidth internet, but a few have no internet access.

The project offers additional content besides Wikipedia, such as Wiktionary. Any content that is first packaged in a ZIM file can be relayed over the Afripedia network; Project Gutenberg and Wikisource, for instance, are available as ZIM files.

The project also encourages the formation of Afripedia clubs for local users.

The project has been described as a worthy stopgap measure, until such time as internet access can be developed throughout Africa.

Timeline 

 Autumn 2011 – Spring 2012 : Project preparation, partnership formation, Kiwix algorithm development
 2012, June 15 : Agreement signed on behalf of the Agence universitaire de la Francophonie, the Institut français, and Wikimédia France, by Bernard Cerquiglini (AUF), Xavier Darcos (IF) and Rémi Mathis (WMFr).
 July 2012 : Presentation of project and prototype at the Forum mondial de la langue française in Québec
 2012, November 6–9 : training of 15 leaders from 12 East and Central African countries held at the Campus numérique francophone at the Université Félix Houphouët-Boigny in Abidjan, Ivory Coast; deployment of 15 offline access points (plug computer + USB key+ wifi router)
 2013, June 24–28 : Second training and deployment, in Kinshasa
 2013, October 14–18 : Third training and deployment, in Yaoundé
 2014, September 29 – October 3: Fourth, Antananarivo

See also
 Internet-in-a-box

References

External links 

 Afripedia project page on the French Wikipedia
Wikipedia
Francophonie